The Quiet American is a 1958 American drama romance thriller war film and the first film adaptation of Graham Greene's bestselling 1955 novel of the same name, and one of the first films to deal with the geo-politics of Indochina. It was written and  directed by Joseph L. Mankiewicz, and stars Audie Murphy, Michael Redgrave, and Giorgia Moll. It was critically well-received, but was not considered a box office success.

The film flips the novel on its head, turning a cautionary tale about foreign intervention into anticommunist advocacy of American power. In writing the script, Mankiewicz received uncredited input from CIA officer Edward Lansdale, who was often said to be the actual inspiration for the American character—called "Pyle" in the novel but unnamed in this film—played by Murphy. In fact Greene did not meet Landsdale until after completing much of the novel. According to Greene, the inspiration for the character of Pyle was Leo Hochstetter, an American serving as public affairs director for the Economic Aid Mission in Indochina who was assumed by the French to “belong to the CIA,” and lectured him on the “long drive back to Saigon on the necessity of finding a ‘third force in Vietnam.’”

The film stirred up controversy.  Greene was furious that his anti-war message was excised from the film, and he disavowed it as a "propaganda film for America."  The Quiet American was remade in 2002, directed by Phillip Noyce, with Brendan Fraser and Michael Caine, in a version more faithful to Greene's novel.

Plot
In Saigon in 1952, as Vietnamese insurgents are delivering major strikes against the French colonial rulers, an innocent and enigmatic young American economist (Audie Murphy), who is working for an international aid organization, gets caught between the Communists and the colonialists as he tries to win the "hearts and minds" of the Vietnamese people.  By promising marriage, he steals away a young Vietnamese woman (Giorgia Moll) from an embittered and cynical English newspaperman (Michael Redgrave), who retaliates by spreading the word that the American is actually covertly selling arms to the anti-Communists.

Cast 
 Audie Murphy as The American (Alden Pyle)
 Michael Redgrave as Thomas Fowler
 Claude Dauphin as Inspector Vigot
 Giorgia Moll as Phượng (secret name Phoenix)
 Bruce Cabot as Bill Granger
 Fred Sadoff as Dominguez
 Kerima as Phuong's Sister (Miss Hel)
 Richard Loo as Mr. Hưng
 Peter Trent as Eliot Wilkins
 Georges Bréhat as French Colonel
 Clinton Anderson as Joe Morton
 Lê Quỳnh as a playboy

Production 
The Quiet American began filming in Saigon on January 28, 1957, then moved to Rome, where shooting finished in late April 1957. It was the first time a feature film was shot in Vietnam. The crew had some difficulty filming there — they had to avoid shooting at noon because of the harsh shadows, they had trouble receiving permission to shoot inside a Buddhist temple because of the moon's phase, and they inadvertently helped a political protest take place that would otherwise have been shut down by the police, because the authorities assumed it had been staged for the film. Audie Murphy fell ill with appendicitis during a weekend shopping trip to Hong Kong and had to undergo an operation.

Humphrey Bogart was reported to have been considered to play the lead role, but it was first offered to Montgomery Clift, with Laurence Olivier to play "Fowler".  When Clift withdrew for reasons of health, he was replaced by Audie Murphy and Olivier then left the project.

Graham Greene had been a war correspondent in Indochina, and was critical of the growing American involvement there. By making the character of Pyle an aid worker and private citizen and not a representative of the American government, and by focusing on the love triangle aspects of the story instead of the geo-politics of the war, producer-director-writer Joseph L. Mankiewicz significantly diluted the impact of Greene's story, which led the author to disavow the film.

Phuong is a young Vietnamese woman, but actress Giorgia Moll is Italian.

Audie Murphy said he never would have done the movie if the tone of the story had not changed from anti-American to pro-American. He said "my part is one of the greatest I've ever had".

Critical response
The film's obscuring of Greene's political points was mentioned by some critics, but the acting was nevertheless noted for its high quality, especially the performance by Michael Redgrave. Also praised were the locations. In The New York Times, Bosley Crowther wrote: "Scenes shot in the streets of Saigon have a vivid documentary quality and, indeed, the whole film has an aroma of genuine friction in the seething Orient."

References

External links
 
 
 
 
 
 The Quiet American at Audie Murphy Memorial Site
 

1958 films
1958 drama films
American black-and-white films
American drama films
Audie Murphy
Cold War films
1950s English-language films
Films about war correspondents
Films about journalists
Films based on British novels
Films based on works by Graham Greene
Films directed by Joseph L. Mankiewicz
Films produced by Joseph L. Mankiewicz
Films set in the French colonial empire
Films set in French Indochina
First Indochina War films
Films with screenplays by Joseph L. Mankiewicz
Films scored by Mario Nascimbene
United Artists films
1950s American films